The Black Forest Girl is a 1933 German operetta film directed by Georg Zoch and starring Maria Beling, Hans Söhnker, and Walter Janssen. The film is based on the 1917 operetta of the same title, composed by Leon Jessel with a libretto by August Neidhart. It was one of several film adaptations of the story. It premiered in Stuttgart on 30 November 1933.

Cast

References

Bibliography

External links

1933 films
Films of Nazi Germany
1930s romantic musical films
German romantic musical films
1930s German-language films
Remakes of German films
Films directed by Georg Zoch
Films set in Germany
Operetta films
Films based on operettas
Sound film remakes of silent films
German black-and-white films
1930s German films